Alang-e Sofla (also Romanized as Alang-e Soflá; also known as Alang-e ‘Alī Beyg), meaning "Lower Alang", is a village in Pasakuh Rural District, Zavin District, Kalat County, Razavi Khorasan Province, Iran. At the 2006 census, its population was 40, in 10 families.

References 

Populated places in Kalat County